Nereoginkgo populifolia is a species of Antarctic marine red alga.

References

External links
AlgaeBase

Kallymeniaceae
Species described in 2009